Shuvalikha is a rural locality (a village) in Bereznikovskoye Rural Settlement, Sobinsky District, Vladimir Oblast, Russia. The population was 15 as of 2010.

Geography 
Shuvalikha is located 30 km south of Sobinka (the district's administrative centre) by road. Pushnino is the nearest rural locality.

References 

Rural localities in Sobinsky District